The Tamron 14-150mm f/3.5-5.8 Di III is an interchangeable camera lens for the Micro Four Thirds camera system, announced by Tamron on June 19, 2014.

External links
Specs

Micro Four Thirds lenses
14-150mm f 3.5-5.8 Di III
Superzoom lenses
Camera lenses introduced in 2014